Gardner's climbing mouse (Rhipidomys gardneri) is a rodent species from South America. It is found in western Brazil, southeastern Peru and northeastern Bolivia. It is an uncommon, arboreal species, but faces no particular threats so the International Union for Conservation of Nature has rated it as being a "least-concern species".

Description
The dorsal fur is short and rather coarse, varying in colour from grey to orange-brown, each hair being banded. The underparts are yellowish, the hairs on the throat and in the centre of the chest having grey bases. The tail is dark brown, clad in short hairs with a short tuft of hairs at the tip. The ears are rounded and of medium size. The dark patch on the upper surface of the large hind feet does not extend onto the toes.

Distribution and habitat
Gardner's climbing mouse is native to southeastern Peru and Acre State, the most westerly state in Brazil, as well as the northeasterly part of Bolivia. It occurs in the drainages of the Rivers Juruá, Ucayeli, Madre de Dios and Beni.

Status
Gardiner's climbing mouse has a wide range but is believed to be an uncommon species. Nevertheless, besides its forest home it has adapted to many disturbed and man-made habitats, including the thatched roofs of houses, and one female was found nursing young in the drawer of a piece of furniture. The International Union for Conservation of Nature has rated its conservation status as being of "least concern".

References

Rhipidomys
Mammals described in 2000